Hansa Teutonica is a German board game designed by Andreas Steding and published by Argentum Verlag in 2009.  It placed in the top 10 at the Deutscher Spiele Preis.

The game can be played with 2–5 players. In addition to the core set, an expansion has been published that adds new rules and modes of play.

Gameplay
The game's theme centers around the Hanseatic League, a group of German cities that formed a trading area in the Middle Ages, and the merchants who traded among them.  The object of the game is to have the largest number of victory points at game's end; these can be obtained through a variety of methods.  Each player must strike a balance between attaining these points and enhancing their own ability to secure additional points at a later stage in the game.

Multi-Touch Conversion

By June 2012 Machine Code Games, LLC completed an electronic conversion of the game to the multi-touch platform. Online sales of the electronic version are managed by Mesa Mundi, Inc. This version remains faithful to the original rules but makes for faster sessions because the game engine automates setup and the calculation of player movement. From the main menu players choose 3 to 6 positions around an elongated version of the standard game board (re-sized to match the 16:9 aspect ratio of HDTV screens). Sound effects and a medieval-styled theme (created by musician Braethun Bharathae-Lane) accompany mtHansa Teutonic.

Honors and awards
 Meeples' Choice Award (2009)
 Golden Geek Best Innovative Board Game Nominee2010
 Golden Geek Best Strategy Board Game Winner (2010)
 Golden Geek Board Game of the Year Winner (2010)
 International Gamers Awards - General Strategy; Multi-player Nominee (2010)
 JoTa Best Heavy Board Game Nominee (2010)
 Spiel der Spiele Hit für Experten Recommended (2010)
 Spiel des Jahres Recommended (2010)
 Nederlandse Spellenprijs Nominee (2011)
 Nederlandse Spellenprijs Winner (2011)

References

Board games introduced in 2009
Board games about history
Multiplayer games